"In the Air Tonight" is the debut solo single by English drummer and singer-songwriter Phil Collins. It was released as the lead single from Collins's debut solo album, Face Value, in January 1981.

Collins co-produced "In the Air Tonight" with Hugh Padgham, who became a frequent collaborator in the following years. It reached No. 2 on the UK Singles chart behind the posthumous release of John Lennon's "Woman". It reached No. 1 in Austria, Germany, Switzerland and Sweden, and the top 10 in Australia, New Zealand and several other European territories.  It reached No. 19 on the Billboard Hot 100 in the United States, but reached No. 2 on the Rock Tracks Chart, later certified gold by the RIAA, representing 500,000 copies sold. The song's music video, directed by Stuart Orme, received heavy play on MTV when the new cable music video channel launched in August 1981.

"In the Air Tonight" remains one of Collins' best-known hits, often cited as his signature song, and is especially famous for its drum break towards the end, which has been described as "the sleekest, most melodramatic drum break in history" and one of the "101 Greatest Drumming Moments". In 2006, the song was ranked at number 35 in VH1's "100 Greatest Songs of the 80s". In 2021, it was listed at No. 291 in Rolling Stone'''s "500 Greatest Songs of All Time".

Background and recording
Inspiration
Collins wrote the song amid the grief he felt after divorcing his first wife Andrea Bertorelli in 1980. In a 2016 interview, Collins said of the song's lyrics: "I wrote the lyrics spontaneously. I'm not quite sure what the song is about, but there's a lot of anger, a lot of despair and a lot of frustration." In a 1997 BBC Radio 2 documentary, the singer revealed that the divorce contributed to his 1979 hiatus from the band Genesis, until they regrouped in October of that year to record the album, Duke. Originally, Collins was going to include the song on Duke, but it was rejected by the band. Tony Banks, however, says he never heard the composition.

Musical style

"In the Air Tonight" has been described as being "at the vanguard of experimental pop" in 1981 and "a rock oddity classic", having been influenced by "the unconventional studio predilections of Brian Eno and Peter Gabriel". It has also been described as a "soft rock classic." Musically, the song consists of a series of ominous chords played on a Sequential Circuits Prophet-5 over a simple drum machine pattern (the Roland CR-78 Disco-2 pattern, plus some programming); processed electric guitar sounds and vocoded vocals, an effect which is increased on key words to add additional atmosphere. The mood is one of restrained anger until the final chorus when an explosive burst of drums finally releases the musical tension and the instrumentation explodes into a thunderous crescendo.

Collins has described obtaining the drum machine specifically to deal with personal issues relating to his divorce through songwriting, telling Mix magazine: "I had to start writing some of this music that was inside me". He improvised the lyrics during a songwriting session in the studio: "I was just fooling around. I got these chords that I liked, so I turned the mic on and started singing. The lyrics you hear are what I wrote spontaneously. That frightens me a bit, but I'm quite proud of the fact that I sang 99.9 percent of those lyrics spontaneously".

Drum sound
The song is famous for its use of the gated reverb drum sound. Fellow musicians and journalists have commented on its use in the record. Black Sabbath singer Ozzy Osbourne called the drum fill "the best ever – it still sounds awesome", while music critic and broadcaster Stuart Maconie was quoted:

The means by which Collins attained the drum sound on this recording was long a source of mystery. The exact process was a result of serendipity: an unintended use of studio technology giving unexpectedly useful results.

In this case, the Solid State Logic SL 4000 mixing board had a "reverse talk-back" circuit (labelled on the board as "Listen Mic"). Normal "talkback" is a button that the mixing engineer has to press in order to talk to the recording musicians (the recording and the mixing parts of a studio are, otherwise, completely sonically isolated). Reverse talkback is a circuit (also button-activated) for the engineer to listen to the musicians in the studio. In order to compensate for sound level differences—people can be close to the reverse talkback microphone or far off—this circuit has a compressor on it, which minimises the differences between loud and soft sounds. While recording "Intruder" for his former bandmate Peter Gabriel's third solo album, at some point Collins started playing the drums while the reverse talkback was activated. Engineer Hugh Padgham was amazed at the sound achieved. Overnight, they rewired the board so that the reverse talkback could be recorded in a more formal manner. Later models of the SSL 4000 allowed the listen mic to be recorded with the touch of a button.

When recording engineer Padgham was brought in to help develop Collins' demos that would become Face Value they recreated the "Intruder" sound using the reverse talkback microphone as well as heavily compressed and gated ambient mics. Padgham continued working with Genesis for Abacab later in 1981 and the same technique (generally referred to as gated reverb) was used, and the powerful drum sound has become synonymous with later Genesis projects and Collins' solo career ever since.

The original single version of "In the Air Tonight" features extra drums that play underneath the song until the signature drum crash (referred to by fans as the "magic break") appears. These were added at the suggestion of Atlantic Records head Ahmet Ertegun. In 2007, Collins wrote:

Release
Speaking about the song's rapid ascension in the music charts, Collins wrote the following in 2007:

The song appeared as part of the soundtrack for the 1983 movie Risky Business and plays when the characters played by Tom Cruise and Rebecca De Mornay have sex on a subway train.

In 1984, the song was memorably used in a scene from the first episode of the television series Miami Vice, which film and television critic Matt Zoller Seitz cited as why the song has been stamped as "Property of Michael Mann" (the series' executive producer) for years, rarely being used in other screen works due to its indelible use in the series, akin to Martin Scorsese's signature use of songs by The Rolling Stones for his films. "In the Air Tonight" received a new wave of attention thanks to its use in the series, enough for it to briefly re-chart in the United States just outside the Billboard Hot 100 at number 102.

The song was remixed in 1988 by Ben Liebrand for his weekly appearance in the Curry & Van Inkel radio show on Dutch radio. The mix was completed and then taken by Liebrand to be part of a mix showcase at the DMC Mixing Championship Finals in London, attended by 3500 worldwide deejays. The mix was picked up by Virgin Records for an official release, which hit Number 4 in the UK charts.

In July 2020, a video reaction to the song by TwinsthenewTrend increased the sales and streaming of Collins's original version. The TwinsthenewTrend first-listen video was viewed 4.9 million times in its first two weeks online. Continued popularity brought new traffic to the Collins song which rose to number 3 on Billboard Digital Song Sales chart in August 2020.

Critical receptionRecord World called the song "futuristic pop that's also rhythmically captivating."

Urban legend
An urban legend has arisen about "In the Air Tonight", according to which the lyrics are based on a drowning incident in which someone who was close enough to save the victim did not help them, while Collins, who was too far away to help, looked on. Increasingly embellished variations on the legend emerged over time, with the stories often culminating in Collins singling out the guilty party while singing the song at a concert. Collins has denied all such stories; he commented on the legends about the song in a BBC World Service interview:

The urban legend is referenced in the song "Stan" by Eminem. The reference is contained in the following lyrics:

The urban legend is referenced in the Family Guy episode "The Peter Principal" as Brian is listening to Bonnie and Joe argue about the contents of the song.

In July 2020, Andrew Norman Wilson released a video titled "In the Air Tonight" on the Phil Collins subreddit that tells the urban legend in detail.

Music video
The music video (directed by Stuart Orme) animates the photograph of Collins's face from the cover of the Face Value album, slowly fading in through the introduction until it fills the screen, singing the first chorus. The video then cuts to Collins sitting in an empty room at night. Twice a spectral figure appears in the window, but only the second time does Collins get up to look at it, then is shown walking to the one door of the room.

Collins's face returns for the second chorus. He is then shown leaving the room and entering a hallway full of doors. The first one is locked, then the second opens and Collins sees himself looking at the window again, only now the spectre has turned into his own reflection.

The third door is locked, but as the fourth one opens, the drum break sounds and the viewer is returned to Collins's face again, this time in thermal coloring, which gradually reverts to black and white. His reflection from the window is briefly superimposed on the face, this time seemingly reflected in water. Collins recedes into the darkness as the song repeats and fades.

In 1983 the music video was released on the home video Phil Collins available on VHS and LaserDisc which received a Grammy nomination for Best Video, Short Form.

Performance
"In the Air Tonight" remains a popular selection on classic rock radio stations. It is the song most often associated with Collins' solo career, and he has performed it at many events, including Live Aid, where he played the song on a piano on the same calendar day in both Philadelphia and London. He also performed the song at The Secret Policeman's Ball, which was his first live performance as a solo artist. "I remember doing 'In the Air Tonight' at Live Aid," he recalled, "and [Pete] Townshend saying, 'Are you going to do that fucking song again?' as it was the only one I ever played."

Single and credits
VSK102 UK Single Release (Martin H)

 "In the Air Tonight"
 "The Roof Is Leaking"

Sleeve includes a black and white 12-page cartoon storyboard drawn by Collins' brother Clive Collins.

UK and US single (1981)
 "In the Air Tonight" – 4:57
 Phil Collins – Roland CR-78 drum machine, vocals, drums, Prophet 5 synthesizer, Rhodes piano, Roland VP-330 vocoder
 John Giblin – bass
 Daryl Stuermer – guitar
 L. Shankar – violins
 "The Roof Is Leaking" – 3:36
 Phil Collins – piano, vocal
 Daryl Stuermer – banjo
 Joe Partridge – slide guitar
 A demo track for "In the Air Tonight" also appeared on the "If Leaving Me Is Easy" single.

12" German maxi-single (1981)
 "In the Air Tonight" (album version) – 5:35
 Phil Collins – Roland CR-78 drum machine, vocals, drums, Prophet 5 synthesizer, Rhodes piano, Roland VP-330 vocoder
 John Giblin – bass
 Daryl Stuermer – guitar
 L. Shankar – violins
 "The Roof Is Leaking" – 3:36
 Phil Collins – piano, vocal
 Daryl Stuermer – banjo
 Joe Partridge – slide guitar

Japan CD single (1988)
 "In the Air Tonight" (extended)
 "In the Air Tonight" ('88 remix)
 "I Missed Again" (Album Version)

German CD single (1990)
 "In the Air Tonight" (extended version) – 7:33 (Additional production by Ben Liebrand)
 "In the Air Tonight" ('88 remix) – 5:07 (Remixed by Phil Collins and Hugh Padgham)
 "I Missed Again" – 3:42
(catalogue 2292-57672-2)

Charts and certifications

Weekly charts

Year-end charts

Certifications

 Personnel 
 Phil Collins – vocals, drums, Roland VP-330 vocoder, CR-78 drum machine, Prophet-5 synthesizer, Rhodes piano
 Daryl Stuermer – guitar
 John Giblin – bass
 L. Shankar – violin

Cover versions
In 2004, the band Nonpoint recorded a cover for their album, Recoil. This cover would later be featured in the soundtrack of the 2006 film adaptation of Miami Vice.
In 2016, the newly formed boy band Mic Lowry released an adaptation of the song titled "Oh Lord". A music video was released on 29 September 2016 on the band's official YouTube page. The band was chosen Elvis Duran's Artist of the Month for March 2017 and were invited to perform the song nationwide in the United States through The Today Show presented by Kathie Lee Gifford and Hoda Kotb. They also performed live on The Wendy Williams Show on 8 March 2017. The song charted in the UK Singles Chart reaching number 54 on the chart.
In 2017, the band In This Moment recorded a cover for their album, Ritual.Also in 2017, Justin Roiland covered the song for an episode of the webseries Lasagna Cat that parodied the scene from Miami Vice''. 
 Marissa Nadler and Stephen Brodsky recorded a cover in 2019.
 Dave Audé covered the song with Nicole Markson and was released on November 24, 2022.

References

External links
 The Singer and the Song, a "Learning English" episode from the BBC World Service, which includes a clip from the song and a recording of Collins reading part of the song's lyrics (in RealAudio)
 "Classic track: In the Air Tonight" About the lyrics and the drum sound.

1981 songs
1981 debut singles
Phil Collins songs
1980s ballads
Number-one singles in Germany
Number-one singles in New Zealand
Number-one singles in Sweden
Number-one singles in Switzerland
Virgin Records singles
Rock ballads
Songs written by Phil Collins
Song recordings produced by Hugh Padgham
Song recordings produced by Phil Collins
Atlantic Records singles
Miami Vice
Songs about depression
Songs about death
Number-one singles in Austria
Breaks
Urban legends
Experimental pop songs